The Aotea Centre is a performing arts and events centre in Auckland, New Zealand. Located at the western edge of Aotea Square, off Queen Street, the centre provides a cultural, entertainment and conventions venue space in the heart of the city, and is managed by Auckland Unlimited (which also operates the Auckland Town Hall and The Civic, both in the vicinity of the Square). The origin of its name is Motu Aotea, the Māori name for Great Barrier Island, which is the largest offshore island of New Zealand and approximately 90 km from downtown Auckland.

The main construction of the centre was finished in 1989, having cost NZ$128.5 million. The centre officially opened the following year.

Designed by the City architect Ewen Wainscott in 1974, the building was not actually built until more than a decade later. It won the NZIA Silver Medal award. Costs escalated greatly during construction resulting in several features being omitted. Due to poor acoustics, the main auditorium required a refit in the mid-1990s and underwent refurbishment in 2012. In the wake of this, the theatre won the inaugural Best Medium Venue at the Entertainment Venues of New Zealand (EVANZ) awards in late 2013.

The Centre provides a range of foyers, gallery spaces, and function rooms as well as the 2,139 seat Kiri Te Kanawa Theatre (formerly ASB Theatre, renamed in 2019) and the much smaller, 186-seat Herald Theatre, which is mainly used by small independent theatre companies. 

In 2000 a design competition was held for the Aotea Precinct, and the winner was the landscape architecture-urban design team consisting of Ted Smyth, Rod Barnett and Dushko Bogunovich.

In 2011, an upgrade of Aotea Square also included a major facelift of the public stairs in front of the Centre, including creating a cafe space (The Terrace Café) under a large veranda open to the Square. The Centre has hosted the 2023 FIFA Womens World Cup to be held in Australia and New Zealand.

Several significant New Zealand artworks are on display in the foyers of the Aotea Centre, including the acclaimed digital work, Ihi, by Lisa Reihana, or the very artistic Aotea Cartouche by Dennis O'Connor made from Eritrea marble and Mt Somers limestone. Out front they have a huge attraction, Waharoa. ‘Waharoa’ is a seven metre high gateway and stands at the entrance to Aotea Square, transforming it into a marae or meeting place. The Aotea Centre also holds Terry Stringer's sculpture of Dame Kiri Te Kanawa, made of bronze, this statue sits on Level 3 of Aotea Centre, adjacent to Door D into the Kiri Te Kanawa Theatre and was unveiled by Dame Kiri Te Kanawa herself. Finally we have Taula, the Anchor Stone. Donated from the people of the Pacific Islands This was given to New Zealand at the 1998  Pacific Vision Conference and places itself by the level 2 stalls at the front of the Aotea Centre, The arrow points to the north-east, in the direction of central Polynesia. The arrangement also suggests Aotearoa New Zealand’s North and South Islands. 

There have been many shows and concerts at the Aotea Centre. They have a very wide variety, from cultural shows to DJ's. The acclaimed Nepal Festival was held at this venue in previous years.

References

External links 
 Photographs of Aotea Square held in Auckland Libraries' heritage collections.

Buildings and structures in Auckland
Theatres in Auckland
Arts centres in New Zealand
Convention centres in New Zealand
Tourist attractions in Auckland
1980s architecture in New Zealand
Auckland CBD